The Heartbreak Kid is a 1993 Australian romantic comedy film directed by Michael Jenkins. It stars Claudia Karvan as Christina Papadopoulos, a 22-year-old Greek-Australian teacher who falls in love with her 17-year-old, soccer-obsessed student, Nick Polides, played by Alex Dimitriades.

The film was based on the 1987 stage play of the same name. It was filmed in the inner suburb of Prahan, Victoria, with many of its real students co-opted as extras. Scenes at the teacher's family home were shot in Avondale Heights in Melbourne's north-west.

Michael Jenkins and Ben Gannon developed the 1994 television series Heartbreak High as a spin-off of the film, with several cast members reprising their roles, reimagined in a Sydney setting.

Plot
Christina Papadopoulos is a sweet and well-meaning 22-year-old school teacher, engaged to ambitious lawyer Dimitri. Christina's entire future seems planned out for her—albeit planned by her fiancé, her father and her priest.

Lively 17-year-old Nick Polides is a student in Christina's Greek class and a soccer fanatic who supports local Melbourne club South Melbourne FC. Nick finds himself attracted to Christina and makes numerous passes at her which she rebuffs. But her resistance begins to crumble as both begin to rebel against the constricting Greek-Australian cultural restraints put upon them.

When Christina becomes the manager of the school's newly formed soccer team, she and Nick begin to spend more time together outside of school hours. Though Christina is initially hesitant at Nick's continuous advances, she soon gives into impulses and engages in an illicit relationship with Nick. She uses the house left by her friend for rendezvous with Nick outside school hours. Their amorous relationship progresses quickly as they fall in love with each other. But as the news of their relationship leaks out, Christina faces severe shaming at her workplace. She is further berated by Nick's father for breaking the trust placed upon her as a teacher. Her fiancé learns of the relationship and gives her a choice that he is willing to let the matter slide if she promises to act as if her past with Nick never occurred. But Christina, by then very much in love with Nick and tired of her overbearing fiancé, breaks off the engagement and leaves to meet up with Nick. She tells Nick of her decision to leave Dimitri and mentions that she would be pursuing degree for a year until Nick graduates. An overjoyed Nick readily agrees and promises to meet up after a year. The film ends on a positive note with their kiss and soccer-play under the sun.

Cast
 Claudia Karvan as Christina Papadopoulos
 Alex Dimitriades as Nick Polides
 Steve Bastoni as Dimitri
 Nico Lathouris as George Polides
 Doris Younane as Evdokia
 Scott Major as Peter Rivers
 George Vidalis as Vasili
 Louise Mandylor as Eleni
 William McInnes as Southgate
 Bao Quach as Tran

Soundtrack
 "The Heartbreak Kid" (John Clifford White) – John Clifford White
 "Teacher I Need You" (Elton John and Bernie Taupin) – Stephen Cummings
 "Love Is All Around" (Reg Presley) – The Persuasions
 "I Can Just (Lose Myself in You)" (Brian Cadd and David Hirschfelder) – Lisa Edwards
 "Vision" (Ashley Rothchild, James MacKinnon, Sean Fonti) – Caligula
 "One" (Paul Hewson, Adam Clayton, Larry Mullen Jr., David Evans) – U2
 "True Love" (Art Neville, Daryl Johnson, Hawk Wolinski) – The Neville Brothers
 "Great Palaces of Immortal Splendour" (Single Gun Theory) – Single Gun Theory
 "Words Written Backwards" (Single Gun Theory) – Single Gun Theory
 "Mozart Requiem, K626 – Introitus" (Mozart) – Mezzo Soprano, Cecilia Bartoli, Vienna Philharmonic Orchestra
 "Mozart Requiem, K626 – Lacrimosa" (Mozart) – Mezzo Soprano, Cecilia Bartoli, Vienna Philharmonic Orchestra
 "Looking for Nick" (John Clifford White)
 "Father and Son" (John Clifford White)
 "Anthem" (John Clifford White)

Production
Mike Jenkins developed the script with Richard Barrett, who wrote the original play, over two years, doing around seven drafts. Jenkins and the cast then rehearsed for three weeks. The Soccer scenes were filmed at South Melbourne's old ground at Middle Park (stadium) with Socceroo Con Boutsianis being the stand in for the soccer scenes involving Nick.

Box office

Awards and nominations
The Heartbreak Kid received three Australian Film Institute Award nominations in 1993, in the categories of Best Supporting Actor (Nico Lathouris), Best Director (Michael Jenkins) and Best Film (Ben Gannon). The film was nominated for and won Best Screenplay at the Montreal World Film Festival in 1993.

References

External links

The Heartbreak Kid at the National Film and Sound Archive
The Heartbreak Kid at Oz Movies

1993 films
1993 romantic comedy films
1990s Australian films
1990s coming-of-age comedy films
1990s English-language films
1990s sex comedy films
1990s teen comedy films
1990s teen romance films
Australian coming-of-age comedy films
Australian romantic comedy films
Australian sex comedy films
Australian teen comedy films
Coming-of-age romance films
Films about teacher–student relationships
Films directed by Michael Jenkins
Films set in schools
Films shot in Melbourne
Films shot in Sydney